Greatest Hits is the first compilation album by American country music artist George Strait, released on March 4, 1985 by MCA Records. It includes all ten singles from Strait's first three albums. It reached No. 4 on the Billboard Top Country Albums chart and had been certified 4× multi-Platinum by the RIAA.

Track listing

Charts

Weekly charts

Year-end charts

Certifications

References

1985 greatest hits albums
George Strait compilation albums
MCA Records compilation albums